Chicken Bristle  may refer to:

Chicken Bristle, Illinois, an unincorporated community in Douglas County
Chicken Bristle, Kentucky, an unincorporated community located in Lincoln County